
Heiner is a German male name, a diminutive of Heinrich, and also a surname.

Given name 
Heiner Backhaus (born 1982), professional footballer
Heiner Baltes (born 1949), former football defender
Heiner Brand (born 1952), former West German handball player
Heiner Dopp (born 1956), former field hockey player from West Germany
Heiner Dreismann, PhD, the former president and CEO of Roche Molecular Systems
Heiner Geißler (born 1930), German politician with the Christian Democratic Union (CDU) party
Heiner Goebbels (born 1952), German composer and music director
Heiner Lauterbach (born 1953), German actor
Heiner Möller (born 1952), West German former handball player
Heiner Mühlmann (born 1938), German philosopher
Heiner Müller (1929–1995), German dramatist, poet, writer, essayist and theatre director
Heiner Zieschang (1936–2004), German mathematician
Klaus-Heiner Lehne (born 1957), German politician and Member of the European Parliament for North Rhine-Westphalia

Family name 
 (1883 – between 1915 and 1925), Austrian pastry chef
Kenneth Heiner-Møller (born 1971), Danish football manager and former player
Daniel Brodhead Heiner (1854–1944), Republican member of the U.S. House of Representatives from Pennsylvania
Madeline Heiner (born 1987), Australian runner

See also 
 Heiner Brau, microbrewery and brewing museum located in the historic Passenger Rail Station building in Covington, Louisiana, United States

References

German masculine given names
German-language surnames
Surnames from given names